The Saxton Group is the largest franchisee of the restaurant McAlister's Deli. It owns and operates more than 80 locations in Texas, Oklahoma, Kansas, Missouri, Iowa and Nebraska with plans to expand by opening an additional 6-10 locations each year. The Saxton Group is headquartered in Dallas, Texas and currently employees more than 3,700 employees at its McAlister's Deli locations and corporate office.

History 
Founded in 1982 by Kelly Saxton, The Saxton Group began in Jackson, Mississippi as a franchisee of Mazzio's Pizza. Between 1982 and 1999, The Saxton Group helped to expand the Mazzio's Pizza brand by opening more than 50 locations throughout Mississippi, as well as Arkansas and Texas. In 2004, Saxton turned his attention to McAlister's Deli and sold all of The Saxton Group's Mazzio's locations. The Saxton Group has grown from one single McAlister's Deli location in 2004 to over 65 McAlister's Deli units in 2017, with plans and agreements to open up as many as 40 additional locations in current markets, as well as new markets in Iowa and Nebraska

Today, The Saxton Group is led by co-CEOs Adam Saxton and Matt Saxton.

References

Restaurant franchises